MiND: Media Independence is an internet and television service developed by Independence Media, the former owners of television station WYBE in Philadelphia, Pennsylvania.  Independence Media is a 501(c)(3) non-profit organization, and television station WYBE was among the largest independently owned and operated non-commercial broadcast television stations in the US.

The MiND service is not only member-supported but mainly developed, produced and marketed by its members. MiND emphasizes community involvement and the sharing of ideas through television and internet video. MiND's slogan is, "Television by the people, for the people."

Every MiND program is 5 minutes long.

In Philadelphia's broadcast version of MiND, international news, Philadelphia Stories and Korean dramas are among the few "long form" programs remaining on the schedule. The internet version of MiND does not include long-form programs.

All short-form (5-minute) programs seen on MiND are shown both on MiND's internet channel and on MiND's television channel. The internet broadcast is delayed up to 5 minutes (so that every 5-minute program is shown in complete form).

Many of MiND's initial programs were produced by MiND' staff, interns, and volunteers. A small but increasing number of MiND programs are produced by members of MiND. The membership program includes individuals (who pay $75 per year for the right to submit MiND programs), non-profits ($500) and for-profit businesses ($1,000). MiND's strict rules regarding program acceptance policies are posted on MiND's website.

MiND launched on the web on April 28, 2008. MiND launched on television on May 15, 2008, in the Philadelphia market. The first program shown on MiND TV was The Pepper Pot: Curry Chicken, produced by MiND's first member, Janet Davis. The first hour of MiND on television also included Fiddler: Overdubbing (featuring Pennsylvania's 9-year-old champion fiddler, Julia Voris), Quench (about Maasai women and their struggle to attain clean drinking water), Lubinville (biography of the first film mogul, based in Philadelphia), and Alix Olson: Pirates (spoken word performance about injustice, politics, and taking back the media).

References

External links
 MiND official site
 Philadelphia Inquirer: "Public-television revolutionary WYBEs new model offers 5-minute shorts"

Community-created content television
Internet television channels
Television channels and stations established in 2008